L.A. Confidential Presents:  is the debut extended play by American rapper . Originally it was supposed to be a full length-album titled Knoc's Landin''', which was shelved due to undisclosed reasons and reduced to an EP released on July 30, 2002 through Elektra Records. Recording sessions took place at Record One Studio, Westlake Audio and Larrabee West Studios in Los Angeles and at South Beach Studios in Miami Beach. Production was handled by Dr. Dre, Bud'da, Fredwreck, Kanye West, S-Dog, the Production Coalition of America, Wallace Sibley Jr. and  himself, with executive producer D. Menefield and associate executive producer Jay Brown. It features guest appearances from Slip Capone, Butch Cassidy, Dr. Dre, Jayo Felony, Missy Elliott, Nate Dogg, Shade Sheist, Timebomb, Too Short, Warren G, Xzibit and Samuel Christian. The album peaked at number 74 on the Billboard 200 and number 26 on the Top R&B/Hip-Hop Albums in the United States.

Two singles were released from the album: "The Knoc" and "Muzik". Its lead single, "The Knoc", peaked at No. 98 on the Billboard Hot 100 and was nominated for a Grammy Award for Best Music Video at the 45th Annual Grammy Awards, but lost to Eminem's "Without Me". Its second single, "Muzik", found mild success in French music chart, peaking at No. 70 after its appearance in 2002 action-thriller film The Transporter''.

Enhanced versions of the EP featured two multimedia extras: the music video for "The Knoc", and a behind-the-scenes feature titled "Bthere with Knoc" shot on location in New York City.

Track listing

Sample credits
Track 2 contains excerpts from "Old Sir, Siam" written by Paul McCartney as performed by Wings

Personnel

Royal "" Harbor – vocals, producer (track 5)
Andre "Dr. Dre" Young – vocals & mixing (track 1), producer (tracks: 1, 3)
Melissa "Missy" Elliott – vocals (track 1)
Samuel Christian – vocals (track 2)
Tramayne "Shade Sheist" Thompson – vocals (track 3)
Nathaniel "Nate Dogg" Hale – vocals (track 3)
Alvin "Xzibit" Joiner – vocals (track 3)
Warren Griffin III – vocals (track 3)
Christen "Slip Capone" Kelley – vocals (tracks: 4, 6)
Danny "Butch Cassidy" Means – vocals (track 4)
James "Jayo Felony" Savage – vocals (track 4)
Marquese "Time Bomb" Holder – vocals (track 4)
Todd "Too $hort" Shaw – vocals (track 6)
Wallace Sibley Jr. – producer (track 1)
Francis Palacios – producer (track 1)
Ross Sloan – producer (track 1)
Kanye West – producer (track 2)
Farid "Fredwreck" Nassar – producer (track 4)
S. "S-Dog" Batiste – producer (track 5)
Stephen "Bud'da" Anderson – producer (track 6)
Carlos Bedoya – engineering (track 1)
Tyson Leeper – recording (track 2)
Richard "Segal" Huredia – mixing (tracks: 2, 4), recording (tracks: 5, 6)
Kevin Guarnieri – engineering & mixing (track 3)
Mauricio Iragorri – engineering (track 3)
K. Solem Richard – mastering
D. Menefield – executive producer
Jay Brown – associate executive producer
Joel Clifton – photography
Estevan Oriol – photography
P. Loc – photography

Charts

References

External links

G-funk EPs
2002 debut EPs
Elektra Records EPs
Knoc-turn'al albums
Albums produced by Bud'da
Albums produced by Dr. Dre
Albums produced by Fredwreck
Albums produced by Kanye West